The Super Prestige Sint-Michielsgestel is a cyclo-cross race held in Sint-Michielsgestel, Netherlands, which is part of the Superprestige.

Past winners

References
 Men's results
 Women's results

Cyclo-cross races
Cycle races in the Netherlands
Recurring sporting events established in 1996
1996 establishments in the Netherlands
Cycling in North Brabant
Sport in Sint-Michielsgestel